Portrait of My Father is an oil on canvas painting by Salvador Dalí, created in 1925, depicting his father, Salvador Rafael Aniceto Dalí Cusí It is currently exhibited at the National Art Museum of Catalonia, in Barcelona.

History
Dalí held his first exhibition at the Galeries Dalmau in Barcelona in 1925, before making his first trip to Paris and moving towards Surrealism. This portrait is considered one of the most outstanding paintings in the exhibition, one of the best from his early period. Dalí focused on the severe expression of his face and, especially in the piercing eyes. The portrait demonstrates the forceful character of his father, who was a notary in Figueres, and with whom he had a difficult relationship. The technical mastery the young painter had already achieved at this time can be noticed in the cleanly drawn outlines, the treatment of light and shade and the expressive power of the sombre tone.

Exhibits
 1925, Barcelona, Galeries Dalmau
 1962, Madrid, Casón del Buen Retiro
 1964, Tokyo, Tokyo Prince Hotel Gallery
 1979, Paris, Centre Georges Pompidou, Musée National d'Art Moderne
 1983, Madrid, Museo Español de Arte Contemporáneo
 1985, London, Hayward Gallery
 1986, Lausanne, Fondation de l'Hermitage
 1987, Kobe, The Hyogo Prefectural Museum of Modern Art
 1987, Barcelona, Palau de la Virreina
 1989, Stuttgart, Staatsgalerie
 1989, Humlebaek, Louisiana Museum of Modern Art
 1994, London, Hayward Gallery  
 1998, Liverpool, Tate Gallery Liverpool
 2004, Venezia, Palazzo Grassi
 2007, London, Tate Modern
 2007, Madrid, Museo Thyssen Bornemisza - Fundación Caja Madrid

References

Paintings in the collection of the Museu Nacional d'Art de Catalunya
1925 paintings
Paintings by Salvador Dalí
Portraits of women